Boulder-Grand Pass, elevation , is a mountain pass that crosses the Continental Divide in Rocky Mountain National Park in Colorado in the United States.

See also

Southern Rocky Mountains
Front Range
Colorado mountain passes

References

External links

Landforms of Boulder County, Colorado
Landforms of Grand County, Colorado
Rocky Mountain National Park
Mountain passes of Colorado
Great Divide of North America